Eucalyptus vegrandis, commonly known as the Ongerup mallee or Cranbrook mallee, is a species of mallee that is endemic to the south-west of Western Australia. It has smooth bark, linear to lance-shaped adult leaves, flower buds in groups of seven, creamy white flowers and cup-shaped or conical fruit.

Description
Flowering occurs in October or February and the flowers are creamy white.

Taxonomy and naming
The specific epithet (vegrandis) is a Latin word meaning "not very large" referring to its small stature.

In 2005, Dean Nicolle and Ian Brooker described two subspecies and the names have been accepted by the Australian Plant Census:
 Eucalyptus vegrandis subsp. recondita D.Nicolle & Brooker has broad, elliptical adult leaves and larger flower buds and fruit;
 Eucalyptus vegrandis L.A.S.Johnson & K.D.Hill subsp. vegrandis has linear to narrow elliptical leaves and small buds and fruit.

Distribution and habitat
Ongerup mallee grows in low-lying places, often with saltbush and is found between Jerramungup, Katanning, Cranbrook and Boxwood Hill. Subspecies vegrandis occurs between Ongerup, Katanning Nyabing, Jerramungup and the Bremer River. Subspecies recondita occurs from Cranbrook to the north and south of the Stirling Range but not on the Range itself.

Conservation status
Eucalyptus vegrandis and its two subspecies are listed as "not threatened" by the Western Australian Government Department of Parks and Wildlife.

See also
List of Eucalyptus species

References

Eucalypts of Western Australia
vegrandis
Myrtales of Australia
Plants described in 1992
Taxa named by Lawrence Alexander Sidney Johnson
Taxa named by Ken Hill (botanist)